Narirutin is a flavanone-7-O-glycoside, consisting of the flavanone naringenin bonded with the disaccharide rutinose.

It is found in orange juice.

References

External links

Flavanone glycosides